Hotel Viking may refer to:

Clarion Hotel The Hub (Oslo), former names: Hotel Viking and Hotel Royal Christiania in Oslo, Norway
Hotel Viking (Newport, Rhode Island), United States, a historic hotel